German submarine U-649 was a Type VIIC U-boat of Nazi Germany's Kriegsmarine during World War II. The submarine was laid down on 12 January 1942 at the Blohm & Voss yard at Hamburg, launched on 30 September 1942, and commissioned on 19 November 1942 under the command of Oberleutnant zur See Raimund Tiesler.

Design
German Type VIIC submarines were preceded by the shorter Type VIIB submarines. U-649 had a displacement of  when at the surface and  while submerged. She had two shafts and two  propellers.

U-649 was fitted with five  torpedo tubes (four fitted at the bow and one at the stern), fourteen torpedoes, one  SK C/35 naval gun, 220 rounds, and one twin  C/30 anti-aircraft gun. The boat had a complement of between forty-four and sixty.

Service history
Attached to 5th U-boat Flotilla based at Kiel, U-649 never completed her training but sank in a collision with  during training in the Baltic Sea on 24 February 1943. Of the crew of 46, eleven survived.

References

Bibliography

External links

German Type VIIC submarines
1942 ships
Ships built in Hamburg
U-boats commissioned in 1942
U-boats sunk in 1943
U-boats sunk in collisions
U-boat accidents
Maritime incidents in February 1943
World War II shipwrecks in the Baltic Sea
World War II submarines of Germany